Lincoln Myers (died 15 March 2016) was a Trinidad and Tobago politician and member of the National Alliance for Reconstruction (NAR). He served as the Environment and National Service minister of Trinidad and Tobago, and member of the House of Representatives for St Ann's East constituency from 1986 to 1991.

He died at his home in Gran Couva on 15 March 2016 and was survived by his wife, Joy Persad-Myers.

References 

Year of birth missing
2016 deaths
Government ministers of Trinidad and Tobago
Members of the House of Representatives (Trinidad and Tobago)
National Alliance for Reconstruction politicians